The Malter, Malterre or Maltaire family was a dynasty of French dancers and choreographers, from which came several members of the 18th century Académie royale de danse.  It was a large family and it can often be difficult to identify its members with certainty, though the relationships given below are attested by contemporary documents:

 René Malter, dance master, member of the Académie royale de danse
 Jean-Pierre Malter (died 1730), dance master, member of the Académie royale de danse
 Claude Malter, dance master in Paris, brother of the above
 François-Antoine Malter (167?–1761), dance master, member of the Académie royale de danse, brother of the two above
 René Malter (1695–1775), member and darling of the Académie royale de danse, son of François-Antoine
 François-Louis Malter (1699–1788), dancer in the ballets du Roi, member of the Académie royale de danse, son of François-Antoine
 Jean-Baptiste Malter (1701–1746), member of the Académie royale de danse, notably danced in Grenoble, Lyon and London.
 François Duval dit Malter (born 1743), ballet master of the Opéra, son of Antoine Duval (dance master) and of Henriette Brigitte Malter, and nephew of the above
 Élisabeth Malter, dancer and ballet mistress
 Jean-François Malter, dancer in the French provinces
 Jean Malter dit Hamoir (died 1805), ballet master of the Théâtre des Variétés-Amusantes from 1779 to 1781
 Pierre-Conrad Malter, ballet master at the Théâtre de l'Ambigu-Comique in 1788.

Other sources indicate that the René Malter named above was the father of three dancers of the Académie royale de danse :
 François-Antoine the elder, nicknamed "la Petite Culotte", entered in 1714, premier danseur comique of the Opéra in 1720
 François-Louis the younger, nicknamed "the Devil"
 Jean-Baptiste, known as Malter III, nicknamed "the Bird" or "the Englishman".

Notes

Bibliography 
 Philippe Le Moal (ed.), Dictionnaire de la Danse, Paris, Larousse, 1999 .
 Eugène Giraudet, Traité de la danse, Paris, published by the author, 1890.
 Auguste-Alexis Baron, Lettres et entretiens sur la danse ancienne, moderne, religieuse, civile, et théâtrale, Paris, Dondey-Dupré, 1824 (2nd edition, 1825, was entitled Lettres à Sophie sur la danse).

+
French families